Rayman is a franchise of platform video games, created by video game designer Michel Ancel for Ubisoft. Since the release of the original Rayman game in 1995, the series has produced a total of 45 games across multiple platforms.

The series is set in a fantastical, magical world which features a wide range of environments that are very often based on certain themes, such as "the Eraser Plains", a landscape made entirely of stationery. The core games of the series are platformers, but there are several spin-off titles in other genres. The protagonist is Rayman, a magical being renowned for his courage and determination who, with the help of his friends, must save his world from various villains.

Games

Main series

Spin-offs

Raving Rabbids

Other

Characters

Playable Characters 

Rayman is the main protagonist of the series. He is a human/vegetable hybrid who has no arms, legs or neck, though he has hands, feet, and a head that are able to move independently from his body. Due to his lack of arms, Rayman is able to throw his fists in long-range punches at his enemies, and in some games is even able to project balls of energy from his hands. He is able to glide by spinning his hair like helicopter blades. He is typically found wearing white gloves, a red neckerchief on a purple body with a white ring in the center (the neckerchief was replaced with a hood in later entries), and yellow trainers (again, slightly modified in the later games). He is voiced by David Gasman in Rayman 2 and Rayman 3.
Globox is a frog who is Rayman's dimwitted best friend and sidekick. Although easily frightened, he has often demonstrated his courage and has a heart of gold. He and his wife Uglette have over 650 children. In Rayman 2, he is voiced by Christian Erickson, but in Rayman 3 is voiced by John Leguizamo.
Grand Minimus is the king of Teensies, magical creatures created to protect the Heart of the world. In Rayman 2, after Rayman saves 4 Teensises with one being the Grand Minimus, they're having trouble remembering who is the king. Grand Minimus is a playable character from Rayman Origins onward.
Goth Teensy is a playable character from Rayman Origins onward, he is the guardian of the door to the Livid dead world to keep them from coming to the surface, his snorings with Rayman and his friends on the job angered the Livid Dead and so they invaded the Glade of Dreams.
Barbara is a spunky, red-haired princess warrior and barbarian who first appeared in Rayman Legends, becoming the first human being to be playable in the main series, simultaneously with another sister and eight other cousins who can be rescued throughout Legends.  She is armed with a flail battle axe, whose head can be launched forward from the shaft to strike foes from a distance, and uses a magical winged helmet to float through the air, mimicking Rayman's helicopter hair ability.  Barbara also returns in Rayman Adventures, having cut her long hair to neck level and exchanged her axe with a shovel.

Supporting characters 
Betilla the Fairy is a benevolent fairy and Rayman's creator. After failing to stop Mr. Dark from stealing the Great Protoon, Betilla assists him in his quest by granting him various new abilities as the game progresses. Betilla reappears in a similar role and with a new curvaceous design in Rayman Origins, where it is revealed she was the one who created Rayman and that she also has 5 sisters, who may also have contributed to the creation of Rayman. 
Ly the Fairy is a benevolent fairy, an ally of Rayman who assists him through the course of the second game and in other versions of Rayman 3 (Game Boy Advance) and Rayman Raving Rabbids (Game Boy Advance).
Murfy serves as a guide to Rayman. He has a hasty nature, unable to deal with failure. He appears bored with his job and cannot be bothered with trivial details. His race is depicted as mischievous and described as "cultivated hedonist". He is voiced by Billy West.
The Teensies are a magical race of ancient, diminutive and wise creatures created by Polukus. 
Polokus, known as "Bubble Dreamer" in Rayman Origins and Legends, is a divine being and, according to Rayman 2, is the creator of Rayman's world. During the plot of Rayman 2, Polokus is sleeping and can only be awoken with four masks that Rayman is tasked with collecting.

Villains 
Mr. Dark is Rayman's archenemy and the main antagonist of the first game. In the game, he stole the Great Protoon and by doing so threw the world into chaos and Rayman went after him to bring it back. He later kidnaped Betilla who was helping Rayman by giving him powers. Rayman faced him and defeated him. In Rayman Origins, his influence inspired the Magician to become a villain.
Admiral Razorbeard is the leader of the Robo-Pirates and the main antagonist of Rayman 2: The Great Escape. He invades Rayman's world and captured its inhabitants and destroyed the Heart of the world, causing Rayman to lose his powers. throughout the game he tries to prevent Rayman from getting the four masks and awakening polukus, who can destroy his troops on the land. At the end of the game, Razorbeard uses a robot called Grolgoth to fight Rayman. After his defeat he sets Grolgoth to self destruct while he escapes. Razorbeard returns as the main antagonist of the Game Boy Advance version of Rayman 3, he kidnaps Globox to harness the energy of the Black Lum he has swallowed. He is voiced by Ken Starcevic in the PlayStation version of the game, and by Matthew Géczy in other ports.
André is a Black Lum and the main antagonist of Rayman 3: Hoodlum Havoc. He was created after Rayman's hands accidentally scared a Red Lum while he was sleeping, since then he has been creating more Black Lums. He was accidentally eaten by Globox. At the end of the game he teamed up with Reflux, an enemy Rayman encountered along the way, to defeat him, but was ultimately defeated and turned back to normal. André returns as the main antagonist of Rayman: Hoodlums' Revenge, a part of his spirit remained in Globox after he was swallowed and extracted out of him. He slowly started to possess Globox, causing him to become mean, but is eventually expelled out of him. He is voiced by Ken Starcevic.
The Magician is a supporting character in the original Rayman and the main antagonist of the Rayman Origins. In the first game the Magician is the same thingamajig as Rayman. At the end of Rayman Origins, The Magician, now a Teensie, is revealed to be the villain of the game, having been inspired by Mr. Dark and replacing him. He returns as the main antagonist of Rayman Legends and clones himself into five separate Dark Teensies for Rayman and his friends to battle.

Reception

Rayman was named the Best New Character award of 1995 by Electronic Gaming Monthly. Since his debut in 1995 on the Atari Jaguar, Rayman has become a popular and recognisable video game character, known for his trademark helicopter power and lack of limbs.

Other media
Rayman appears as a collectible trophy in Super Smash Bros. for Wii U, appearing as a fully rendered model sent to the developers by Ubisoft themselves along with Globox and Barbara. Rayman appears as a playable character in Brawlhalla. Rayman also makes an appearance in Super Smash Bros. Ultimate as a spirit.

Rayman has been the subject of a short-lived animated television series in 1999, Rayman: The Animated Series, which was produced as a tie-in to the video games, though significantly different from the source material. Only four episodes were made.

In 2019, another animated TV series was announced to be in works at Ubisoft Film & Television.

Notes

References

External links

 

 
Ubisoft franchises
Video games adapted into television shows
Video game franchises
Video game franchises introduced in 1995